Chernorizets Hrabar (Črĭnorizĭcĭ Hrabrŭ) was a Bulgarian monk, scholar and writer who worked at the Preslav Literary School at the end of the 9th and the beginning of the 10th century.

Name 

His appellation is correctly translated as "Hrabar, the Black Robe Wearer" (i.e., Hrabar The Monk),  chernorizets being the lowest rank in the monastic hierarchy (translatable as "black robe-wearer", see wikt:Reconstruction:Proto-Slavic/čьrnъ and wikt:riza), "Hrabar" ("Hrabr") supposed to be his given name. However, sometimes he is referred to as "Chernorizets the Brave", "Brave" which is the translation of Hrabar assumed to be a nickname.

No biographical information is available about him, but his name is usually considered to be a pseudonym used by one of the other famous men of letters at the Preslav Literary School or maybe even by Tsar Simeon I of Bulgaria (893-927) since normally monks assume Christian names of biblical or early Christian onomastics.

On the Letters  

Chernorizets Hrabar is (as far as is known) the author of only one literary work, "On the Letters" (O pismenĭhŭ), one of the most admired and popular works of literature written in Old Church Slavonic. The work was supposedly written sometime after the Preslav Ecclesiastical People's Council in 893, but before 921, and is the only known medieval literary work to quote the exact year of the invention of the Glagolitic alphabet (855). The work was partly based on Greek scholia and grammar treatises and expounded on the origin of the Glagolitic alphabet and Slavic Bible translation.

In On the Letters, Chernorizets Hrabar defends the alphabet against its Greek critics and proves not only its right to exist but also its superiority to the Greek alphabet arguing that the Greek letters are neither the oldest known to man nor divine. At the same time, Chernorizets Hrabar opposes Glagolitic dogmatists and makes several suggestions as to how the alphabet can be further improved.

He also provided information critical to Slavonic paleography with his mention that the pre-Christian Slavs employed "strokes and incisions" (črŭty i rězy, translated as "tallies and sketches" below) writing that was, apparently, insufficient properly to reflect the spoken language. It is thought that this may have been a form of runic script but no authentic examples are known to have survived.

Textual criticism

The manuscript of On the Letters has been preserved in 79 copies in seven families of texts, including five contaminated manuscripts, plus four abridgements independent of the seven families. All of these families probably ultimately share a common protograph. Not one of the textual families contains an optimal text, and none of them can be established to be the source of any other. None of the text families can be shown to have dialectal features, albeit some of the individual manuscripts in the families do have them. The protograph was written in Glagolitic, and it underwent significant change or corruption in the course of its successive transcription into seven families of Cyrillic texts. Today only Cyrillic manuscripts survive. The hyparchetypes of all seven families give the number of the letters in the alphabet as 38, but the original Glagolitic alphabet had only 36, as attested in the acrostic of Constantine of Preslav; however, one of the abridgements instead gives the number as 37 and another gives it as 42.

The oldest surviving manuscript copy dates back to 1348 and was made by the monk Laurentius for Tsar Ivan Alexander of Bulgaria. The work has also been printed in Vilnius (1575–1580), Moscow (1637), Saint Petersburg (1776), Supraśl (1781).

Excerpt 

Being still pagans, the Slavs did not have their own letters, but read and communicated by means of tallies and sketches. After their baptism they were forced to use Roman and Greek letters in the transcription of their Slavic words but these were not suitable ... At last, God, in his love for mankind, sent them St. Constantine the Philosopher, called Cyril, a learned and upright man, who composed for them thirty-eight letters, some (24 of them) similar to the Greek, but some (14 of them) different, suitable to express Slavic sounds.

Legacy

Hrabar Nunatak on Greenwich Island in the South Shetland Islands, Antarctica is named for Chernorizets Hrabar.

See also 
 Clement of Ohrid 
 Constantine of Preslav
 John Exarch
 Cosmas the Priest
Pre-Christian Slavic writing
History of Bulgaria
Simeon I of Bulgaria

Footnotes

Notes 

9th-century births
10th-century deaths
9th-century Bulgarian writers
10th-century Bulgarian writers
Chernorizets Hrabar
Old Church Slavonic writers
Preslav Literary School